The 2014–15 San Diego Toreros women's basketball team will represent the University of San Diego in the 2014–15 college basketball season. The Toreros, members of the West Coast Conference, are led by head coach Cindy Fisher, in her tenth season at the school. The Toreros play their home games at the Jenny Craig Pavilion on the university campus in San Diego, California. They finished the season 25–7, 14–4 in WCC play to finish in second place. They advanced to semifinals the WCC women's tournament where they lost to San Francisco. They were invited to the Women's National Invitation Tournament where they defeated Long Beach State in the first round before losing to UCLA in the second round.

Roster

Schedule

|-
!colspan=9 style="background:#002654; color:#97CAFF;"| Exhibition

|-
!colspan=9 style="background:#002654; color:#97CAFF;"| Non-Conference regular season

|-
!colspan=9 style="background:#002654; color:#97CAFF;"| WCC regular season

|-
!colspan=9 style="background:#97CAFF;"| WCC Women's Tournament

|-
!colspan=9 style="background:#97CAFF;"| WNIT

References

San Diego
San Diego Toreros women's basketball seasons
San Diego Toreros
San Diego Toreros